The 2011 FIVB Girls Youth Volleyball World Championship was held in Ankara, Turkey, from 12 to 21 August 2011. 16 teams participated in the tournament.

Qualification process

Competing nations
The following national teams have qualified:

Venues
Başkent Volleyball Hall (7,600 seats) – Pool A, C
Ankara Arena (10,400 seats) – Pool B, D

First round

Pool A

Pool B

Pool C

Pool D

Second round

Pool E

Pool F

Pool G

Pool H

Semifinal round

Classification 13th–16th

Classification 9th–12th

Classification 5th–8th

Classification 1st–4th

Final round

15th place match

13th place match

11th place match

9th place match

7th place match

5th place match

3rd place match

Final

Final standing

Individual awards

Most Valuable Player

Best Scorer

Best Spiker

Best Blocker

Best Server

Best Digger

Best Setter

Best Receiver

Best Libero

References

External links
 Official Website

World Youth Championship
FIVB Girls Youth World Championship
2011
World 2011
Youth volleyball in Turkey
FIVB Volleyball Girls' U18 World Championship